Oton, officially the Municipality of Oton,  is a 1st class municipality in the province of Iloilo, Philippines. According to the 2020 census, it has a population of 98,509 people making it as the most populous town in the province and the entire Panay island.

It is the second oldest Spanish settlement in the Philippines after Cebu, founded in 1566.

Oton is a part of the Metro Iloilo–Guimaras area, centered on Iloilo City.

History

Ogtong, former name of Oton, was settled by Malays. A gold death mask from that period was unearthed in the 1960s in Barangay San Antonio. There was a mention of Oton in Yuan Dynasty records in the 1300s when Oton was called in Hokkien . The Spanish arrived in middle of 16th century and made Oton as Capital of Panay, Negros, and Romblon. From Oton as capital, Spanish missionaries spread the Catholic church in neighboring settlements such as Jaro, Iloilo, Tigbauan, Cordova, Alimodian, Igbaras, Tubungan, Camando, Damilisan, and Tiolas. New agricultural products from the Manila galleon trade arrived in Oton where a number of ships arriving from Cebu were stationed and then moved to Manila. Because Oton was vulnerable to, and difficult to defend from pirate attacks, Spanish colonial authorities decided to move the capital to few kilometers away to La Punta (now Iloilo City Proper) around 1600s.

Geography
Oton is bordered by the municipality of Tigbauan to the west, San Miguel to the north, Pavia to the northeast, Panay Gulf to the south, and the district of Arevalo, Iloilo City to the east. The town is a part of Metro Iloilo-Guimaras which encompasses the whole island province of Guimaras with its municipalities, the Iloilo City, and the Iloilo provincial towns of Pavia, Leganes, San Miguel, Santa Barbara, and Cabatuan.

Barangays
Oton is politically subdivided into 37 barangays.

The Municipality of Oton belongs to the 1st District of Iloilo.

Listed below are the respective population of each barangay as of 2020 census.

Climate

Demographics

Religion 
As a Catholic Dominant Municipality, Oton has two parishes.

Parishes:

 Immaculate Concepcion Parish (Town Parish)
 Sta. Monica Parish  (Sta. Monica, Oton)

Language

Kinaray-a is the main speech of the people in Oton. Hiligaynon is spoken as a secondary dialect. There is a fairly unnoticed linguistic division of the town between the two aforementioned languages; the eastern part bordering Iloilo City primarily speak Hiligaynon, the western part bordering the other 1st District municipalities generally speak Kinaray-a and Hiligaynon.

Economy

The economy of Oton is fueled by growing number of real estates and geographic advantage due to its proximity to Iloilo City. Due to increasing demand of retail, Gaisano Oton, Puregold Oton, and Vista Mall Iloilo were built. The town has quite a few number of banking institutions as well. The Iloilo Provincial Agricultural Statistics reported rice production and fruits are among top economic drivers. It has a number of hotels, resorts, and restaurants.

Vista City Iloilo in Oton is a  flagship master-planned city by Vista Land in the Visayas that stretches from Barangay Polo Maestra Bita to Barangay Abilay Norte. Along with existing residential areas, it will house a  central business district.

References

External links

 
 Iloilo Travel Website
 [ Philippine Standard Geographic Code]
 Philippine Census Information
 Local Governance Performance Management System

Municipalities of Iloilo
Former provincial capitals of the Philippines
Populated places established in 1566
1566 establishments in the Philippines